Ermengol, Count of Urgell may refer to:

Ermengol I, Count of Urgell
Ermengol II, Count of Urgell
Ermengol III, Count of Urgell
Ermengol IV, Count of Urgell
Ermengol V, Count of Urgell
Ermengol VI, Count of Urgell
Ermengol VII, Count of Urgell
Ermengol VIII, Count of Urgell
Ermengol IX, Count of Urgell
Ermengol X, Count of Urgell